The 2019 WNBA season was the 22nd season for the Dallas Wings franchise of the WNBA. This was the franchise's 4th season in Dallas.  The season tipped off on May 24, 2019 versus the Atlanta Dream.

During the off-season, interim coach Taj McWilliams-Franklin was not retained.  Brian Agler was hired from the Los Angeles Sparks to become the team's new head coach.

The Wings started the season slowly, losing their first five games in a row.  However, they turned things around, winning 4 of their next 6 to finish June with a 4–7 record.  July proved to be disastrous for the Wings.  They posted a 1–8 record in July only beating the Los Angeles Sparks at home.  The Wings managed to turn things around in August, going 5–6 overall.  Three of those five wins game against eventual playoff teams.  The team couldn't keep the momentum going, finishing the season on a 4 game losing streak.  Their final record of 10–24, was the franchises worst record since moving to Dallas,  and worst record since 2012.  Rookie Arike Ogunbowale proved to be a bright spot for the team.  She won Rookie of the Month in June and August and lead the team in points scored per game, and assists per game.

Transactions

WNBA Draft

Trades and roster changes

Current roster

Game log

Pre-season

|- style="background:#fcc;"
| 1
| May 13
| vs. Atlanta Dream
| L 59–82
| Burke (11)
| 3 tied (5)
| 3 tied (2)
| Mohegan Sun Arena3,300
| 0–1
|- style="background:#bbffbb;"
| 2
| May 14
| @ Connecticut Sun
| W 71–67
| Ogunbowale (19)
| Gray (10)
| 3 tied (2)
| Mohegan Sun Arena3,965
| 1–1
|- style="background:#fcc;"
| 3
| May 19
| Indiana Fever
| L 66–71
| McCarty–Williams (14)
| Gray (5)
| 3 tied (2)
| College Park Center3,428
| 1–2

Regular season

|- style="background:#fcc;"
| 1
| May 24
| @ Atlanta Dream
| L 72–76
| Gray (14)
| Johnson (9)
| McCarty–Williams (8)
| State Farm Arena3,070
| 0–1

|- style="background:#fcc;"
| 2
| June 1
| Minnesota Lynx
| L 67–70
| Thornton (12)
| Stevens (8)
| Thornton (3)
| College Park Center6,535
| 0–2
|- style="background:#fcc;"
| 3
| June 7
| @ Indiana Fever
| L 64–79
| Harrison (18)
| Tied (7)
| McCarty–Williams (4)
| Bankers Life Fieldhouse3,671
| 0–3
|- style="background:#fcc;"
| 4
| June 9
| @ Washington Mystics
| L 62–86
| Johnson (15)
| Johnson (9)
| Davis (5)
| St. Elizabeth's East Arena3,564
| 0–4
|- style="background:#fcc;"
| 5
| June 13
| Indiana Fever
| L 72–76
| Thornton (19)
| Gray (8)
| Plaisance (4)
| College Park Center3,562
| 0–5
|- style="background:#bbffbb;"
| 6
| June 15
| Atlanta Dream
| W 71–61
| Ogunbowale (17)
| Gray (8)
| Johnson (4)
| College Park Center5,220
| 1–5
|- style="background:#bbffbb;"
| 7
| June 20
| Phoenix Mercury
| W 69–54
| Thornton (18)
| Tied (11)
| Tied (3)
| College Park Center4,626
| 2–5
|- style="background:#fcc;"
| 8
| June 22
| @ Las Vegas Aces
| L 68–86
| Ogunbowale (25)
| Thornton (10)
| McCarty–Williams (5)
| Mandalay Bay Events Center4,347
| 2–6
|- style="background:#bbffbb;"
| 9
| June 26
| Connecticut Sun
| W 74–73
| Ogunbowale (23)
| Gray (7)
| Plaisance (5)
| College Park Center4,017
| 3–6
|- style="background:#fcc;"
| 10
| June 28
| @ New York Liberty
| L 68–69
| Thornton (20)
| Plaisance (10)
| Ogunbowale (5)
| Westchester County Center2,191
| 3–7
|- style="background:#bbffbb;"
| 11
| June 30
| Minnesota Lynx
| W 89–86
| Ogunbowale (19)
| Plaisance (10)
| 3 tied (5)
| College Park Center4,521
| 4–7

|- style="background:#fcc;"
| 12
| July 5
| Indiana Fever
| L 56–76
| Tied (15)
| Plaisance (7)
| McCarty–Williams (4)
| College Park Center5,093
| 4–8
|- style="background:#fcc;"
| 13
| July 7
| @ Chicago Sky
| L 66–78
| Ogunbowale (22)
| Tied (8)
| Tied (5)
| Wintrust Arena6,102
| 4–9
|- style="background:#bbffbb;"
| 14
| July 9
| Los Angeles Sparks
| W 74–62
| Thornton (17)
| Tied (6)
| Davis (4)
| College Park Center6,885
| 5–9
|- style="background:#fcc;"
| 15
| July 12
| @ Seattle Storm
| L 81–95
| Ogunbowale (23)
| Johnson (9)
| Davis (9)
| Alaska Airlines Arena6,451
| 5–10
|- style="background:#fcc;"
| 16
| July 14
| Chicago Sky
| L 79–89
| Ogunbowale (20)
| McGee-Stafford (8)
| Gray (4)
| College Park Center4,261
| 5–11
|- style="background:#fcc;"
| 17
| July 17
| @ Phoenix Mercury
| L 64–69
| Ogunbowale (14)
| McGee-Stafford (11)
| Tied (3)
| Talking Stick Resort Arena10,143
| 5–12
|- style="background:#fcc;"
| 18
| July 18
| @ Los Angeles Sparks
| L 64–69
| Harrison (14)
| Harrison (9)
| Ogunbowale (7)
| Staples Center14,050
| 5–13
|- style="background:#fcc;"
| 19
| July 20
| Phoenix Mercury
| L 66–70
| Thornton (16)
| Plaisance (10)
| Tied (3)
| College Park Center5,471
| 5–14
|- style="background:#fcc;"
| 20
| July 30
| @ Las Vegas Aces
| L 54–86
| Ogunbowale (14)
| Tied (8)
| Gray (4)
| Mandalay Bay Events Center3,756
| 5–15

|- style="background:#bbffbb;"
| 21
| August 1
| New York Liberty
| W 78–64
| Ogunbowale (22)
| Gustafson (8)
| Gray (9)
| College Park Center4,011
| 6–15
|- style="background:#fcc;"
| 22
| August 3
| Las Vegas Aces
| L 70–75
| Ogunbowale (24)
| 3 tied (4)
| Gray (4)
| College Park Center5,882
| 6–16
|- style="background:#fcc;"
| 23
| August 8
| @ Seattle Storm
| L 57–69
| Thornton (14)
| Harrison (7)
| Ogunbowale (6)
| Angel of the Winds Arena6,268
| 6–17
|- style="background:#bbffbb;"
| 24
| August 10
| @ Phoenix Mercury
| W 80–77
| Ogunbowale (23)
| Harrison (9)
| Ogunbowale (4)
| Talking Stick Resort Arena9,717
| 7–17
|- style="background:#bbffbb;"
| 25
| August 14
| Los Angeles Sparks
| W 84–78
| Ogunbowale (35)
| 3 tied (6)
| 3 tied (2)
| College Park Center5,004
| 8–17
|- style="background:#bbffbb;"
| 26
| August 16
| New York Liberty
| W 83–77
| Gray (22)
| Tied (7)
| Ogunbowale (5)
| College Park Center4,070
| 9–17
|- style="background:#fcc;"
| 27
| August 18
| @ Connecticut Sun
| L 68–78
| Gray (22)
| Harrison (13)
| Harrison (4)
| Mohegan Sun Arena7,275
| 9–18
|- style="background:#fcc;"
| 28
| August 22 
| @ Minnesota Lynx
| L 70–86
| Ogunbowale (22)
| McCarty–Williams (5)
| Tied (3)
| Target Center8,124
| 9–19
|- style="background:#fcc;"
| 29
| August 25 
| Atlanta Dream
| L 73–77
| Ogunbowale (29)
| Harrison (10)
| Tied (2)
| College Park Center4,715
| 9–20
|- style="background:#bbffbb;"
| 30
| August 29 
| @ Chicago Sky
| W 88–83
| Ogunbowale (35)
| Harrison (12)
| Ogunbowale (6)
| Wintrust Arena5,614
| 10–20
|- style="background:#fcc;"
| 31
| August 31
| Washington Mystics
| L 85–91
| Ogunbowale (30)
| Anigwe (9)
| Ogunbowale (7)
| College Park Center5,205
| 10–21

|- style="background:#fcc;"
| 32
| September 4
| @ Connecticut Sun
| 72–102
| Ogunbowale (32)
| 3 tied (4)
| Ogunbowale (6)
| Mohegan Sun Arena6,284
| 10–22
|- style="background:#fcc;"
| 33
| September 6
| @ Washington Mystics
| L 73–86
| Ogunbowale (30)
| Tied (8)
| Ogunbowale (6)
| St. Elizabeth's East Arena3,963
| 10–23
|- style="background:#fcc;"
| 34
| September 8
| Seattle Storm
| L 64–78
| Ogunbowale (25)
| Harrison (8)
| Ogunbowale (5)
| College Park Center5,910
| 10–24

Standings

Statistics

Regular season

Source:

Awards and honors

References

External links
The Official Site of the Dallas Wings

Dallas Wings seasons
Dallas Wings